Andrei Costin Tîrcoveanu (born 22 May 1997) is a Romanian footballer who plays as a midfielder for Liga I side FC Argeș Pitești.

Honours
Dinamo București
Cupa Ligii: 2016–17

Viitorul Constanța
Cupa României: 2018–19
Supercupa României: 2019

References

External links

1997 births
Living people
Footballers from Bucharest
Romanian footballers
Association football midfielders
Liga I players
Liga II players
FC Dinamo București players
CS Gaz Metan Mediaș players
FC Viitorul Constanța players
CS Concordia Chiajna players
FC Botoșani players
FC Argeș Pitești players